Eleni Daniilidou and Coco Vandeweghe were the defending champions, having won the event in 2013, but both players chose not to participate.

Jan Abaza and Melanie Oudin won the title, defeating Nicole Melichar and Allie Will in an All-American final, 6–2, 6–3.

Seeds

Draw

References 
 Draw

Coleman Vision Tennis Championships - Doubles
Coleman Vision Tennis Championships
2014 Coleman Vision Tennis Championships